"Magnetic" is a song by American band Earth, Wind & Fire, released in November 1983 on Columbia Records as the first single from their thirteenth studio album, Electric Universe (1983). It reached No. 10 on the US Billboard Hot R&B Singles chart, No. 36 on the Billboard Dance Club Play chart and No. 23 on the UK Blues & Soul Top British Soul Singles chart. "Magnetic" also reached No. 16 on the Belgian Pop Singles chart and No. 18 on the Dutch Pop Singles chart.

Overview
"Magnetic" was written by Martin Page and produced by Maurice White for Kalimba Productions. The song is four minutes and twenty one seconds long with an allegro tempo that's at 141 beats per minute.

"Magnetic" came upon EWF's 1983 studio album Electric Universe. The single's b-side is The Speed of Love, a track on EWF's 1983 studio album Powerlight.

During December 1983 "Magnetic"'s accompanying music video was issued by Columbia. Charlie Jane Anders of io9 has proclaimed that "of all the neon-dystopia music videos that came out after Blade Runner, my favorite is probably 1983's "Magnetic" by Earth Wind & Fire".

Critical reception
Pam Lambert of The Wall Street Journal proclaimed  "vocals, driven ahead by the force of the bass guitar, also carry the charged single Magnetic." Prentis Rogers of the Atlanta Journal-Constitution acclaimed "the catchy hooks of magnetic". 
Cash Box wrote "This elemental aggregation has been yo-yo-ing on the charts of late, and this preview track from the forthcoming 'Electric Universe' LP bursts with a fresh, energetic dance verve that ought to re-solidify their star stature. White is unshy about bringing a hot electric guitar into the mix, and its presence is reinforced by the repeated line, 'Don't break the circuit'. Human contact is the thrust here, as the band’s new approach provides a modern street and dance floor soundtrack." Billboard declared that "a densely layered arrangement billows around hard edged group vocals and driving rhythm" on Magnetic." The magazine also stated "EWF continues to keep abreast of the newest sounds without compromising its musical identity". 

Paul Willistein of The Morning Call said "EW&F leaves behind the cosmic subject matter, the usual arrangements and harmonies and gets physic(s)al with its dance/funk hit Magnetic". Willistein added "with Magnetic, EW&F using a techno funk mix and lyrics that are, well downright earthy, has produced one of the most exciting cuts of its long career". Paul Bursche of Number One called Magnetic "A fiery uptempo working". Lennox Samuels of The Dallas Morning News found that "High Priest Maurice White effectively blends lyrics of love and concerns of the nuclear age on Spirit of a New World and Magnetic, using a musical strategy that includes sythesizer settings and handclaps". Robert Palmer of The New York Times proclaimed that "the rich vocal harmonies and lapidary pop craftsmanship listeners have learned to expect from Earth, Wind & Fire are still in evidence, but the group's instrumental sound has been radically stripped down and rethought."

Music critic Robert Christgau of The Village Voice also placed the song at number 20 on his dean's list of 1983.

Credits
Producer, Vocals, Drums, Percussion, Kalimba – Maurice White
Rhythm Guitar – Roland Bautista
Bass Guitar – Verdine White
Vocals, Congas, Percussion – Philip Bailey
Drums – Fred White
Synthesizer, Composer - Martin Page
Drums, Percussion, Vocals – Ralph Johnson
Keyboards – Larry Dunn
Saxophone, Flute, Percussion – Andrew Woolfolk
Arranger, Synthesizer – Jerry Hey

Accolades

Charts

References

Earth, Wind & Fire songs
1983 singles
1983 songs
American new wave songs
American synth-pop songs
Columbia Records singles